The Luodong Forestry Culture Park is a park in Luodong Township, Yilan County, Taiwan.

History
In 1905, the original site of the park became a major timber production area of the Luodong Branch of the Taiping Forest Area, drawn by the Forestry Agency of the Empire of Japan. The logs used to be transported out of Yilan on the Lanyang River. In 1921, the agency purchased a Taiwan Sugar Railway from the Taiwan Sugar Factory and used it as the Luodong Forest Railway to transport timber.

In 1982, the government adjusted its policies on the forestry industry and production from the area started to decline. In 1994–2001, the Third Luodong Township Urban Planning Review designated the area to be a special forestry industry culture site. In 2004, the Forestry Bureau unveiled a plan to turn the area into a culture park. Also in the same year, the Council for Cultural Affairs listed all of the remaining artifacts and buildings in the area as historical assets. The area was then turned into the Luodong Forestry Culture Park in 2009 and listed as a cultural landscape area in 2012.

Geography
The park spans over an area of 16 hectares. It consists of several timber ponds.

Architecture
The culture park is divided into several areas:
 art district
 artifact exhibition hall
 bamboo railway station
 primitive habitat
 storage pool

Transportation
The park is accessible within walking distance north of Luodong Station of Taiwan Railways.

See also
 List of tourist attractions in Taiwan

References

External links

 

2009 establishments in Taiwan
Forest parks in Taiwan
Geography of Yilan County, Taiwan
Forestry in Taiwan
Parks in Yilan County